'Dini ya Msambwa (Religion of the Ancestor) is an African traditional religion that has been labeled  an anti-colonial religion. It is practiced primarily among speakers of the Luhya language of Western Kenya.

Dini ya Msambwa stood against colonialism during the British colonial rule of Kenya. Among other things, it criticized the undermining, by the British colonial government, of elder authority and of the cultural values that had held Kenyan peoples together for ages.

The first European to reach the Bukusu was Joseph Thomson, who upon arriving in 1883, found the Bukusu living in fortified villages surrounded by moats. These were a protection against raids from the Uasin Gishu people and the Teso people. British administration was established in North Nyanza in 1894. The following year the Bukusu killed 25 soldiers of the Sudanese garrison and a punitive expedition was undertaken against them. Their fortified villages were stormed by Sudanese troops and Africans from other tribes, and the fighting ended when the Bukusu acknowledged British rule and promised to abandon their villages. Today they live in scattered homesteads.

The old authority of the tribal elders had been undermined with the advent of colonial rule. It was the elders in turn who had lent power to the old tribal religion or African traditional religion and hence it too was also undermined. Left in a spiritual vacuum, many Bukusu and luhya, insecure in the rapidly-changing world, gravitated naturally into Christianity. Masinde being an elder refused to convert.

The religion was founded by Elijah Masinde in 1936. After Kenyan independence 1968 Dini ya Msambwa was declared illegal and Masinde was arrested for fomenting hatred of the Christian religion.
Dini Ya Msambwa takes the form of an African traditional religion; its followers worshipping Through Ancestral Spirits (Msambwa) in shrines. The veneration of ancestors is an important part of the religion.

References

External links
 Emergency in Kenya: Kikuyu And The Mau Mau Insurrection CSC 1984 SUBJECT AREA Strategic Issues

Anti-imperialism in Africa
New religious movements
Religion in Kenya
Traditional African religions
Religious organizations established in the 1930s